Sergei Alekseevich Kirillov (1960 in Moscow, Soviet Union) is a leading modern Russian artist, who is focusing on historical paintings. His subjects have included Dmitry Mikhailovich Bobrok, Stepan Razin, Princess Olga, Ivan the Terrible, Saint Sergius of Radonezh, and Dmitry Donskoy.

Education and work
In 1984 he graduated from The Surikov Art Institute in Moscow, from the studio of Professor Dmitry Konstantinovich Mochalsky. His graduate work was depicting Peter the Great. His paintings are now regularly published in history classroom books, monographs of The History of Russia, and historical belletristic literature. Since 1987, 24 exhibitions of his paintings have been held in Moscow and other cities in Russia.

Holdings by museums
His works are in the State Tretyakov Gallery, and the art museums of Pereslavl, Bryansk, Alexandrov, and other towns in Russia.

References

External links
 Curriculum vitae of Serguei Kirillov ( Russian Art Gallery)
https://www.kirillovgallery.ru/index.php?lang=eng (online collection of works, English site version)

20th-century Russian painters
Russian male painters
21st-century Russian painters
Living people
1960 births
20th-century Russian male artists
21st-century Russian male artists